Preston City Council elections are generally held three years out of every four, with a third of the council elected each time. Preston City Council is the local authority for the non-metropolitan district of Preston in Lancashire, England. Since the last boundary changes in 2019, 48 councillors have been elected from 16 wards.

Political control

From 1889 to 1974 Preston was a county borough, independent of any county council. Under the Local Government Act 1972 it had its territory enlarged, gaining Fulwood Urban District and most of Preston Rural District, and at the same time became a non-metropolitan district, with Lancashire County Council providing county-level services. The first election to the reformed borough council was held in 1973, initially operating as a shadow authority before the new arrangements took effect on 1 April 1974. Preston was awarded city status in 2002. Political control of the council since 1973 has been held by the following parties:

Leadership
The leaders of the council since 1992 have been:

Notes
† Independent 1, Labour Independent 1
i Independent 1
* Labour Independent 2
^ Labour Independent 3, People's Party 1
# Independent 2 (one elected as Socialist Alliance Against the War), Labour Independent 2
α Deepdale Independent 2
β Deepdale Independent 2, Independent Socialist 1
γ Deepdale Independent 1
** Independent 1, Deepdale Independent 1
1 During September 1999 two councillors formed "The People's Party"
2 During November 2008 one councillor changed his designation from the Respect Party to Independent Socialist
3 During August 2018 two councillors formed an Independent Conservatives group.
4 During May 2020 one councillor resigned their seat, which remained vacant until restrictions in place due to the COVID-19 pandemic are lifted.

Council elections

1970s
1973 Preston Borough Council election
1975 Preston Borough Council election
1976 Preston Borough Council election (New ward boundaries)
1978 Preston Borough Council election
1979 Preston Borough Council election

1980s
1980 Preston Borough Council election
1982 Preston Borough Council election
1983 Preston Borough Council election
1984 Preston Borough Council election
1986 Preston Borough Council election
1987 Preston Borough Council election
1988 Preston Borough Council election

1990s
1990 Preston Borough Council election (New ward boundaries)
1991 Preston Borough Council election
1992 Preston Borough Council election
1994 Preston Borough Council election
1995 Preston Borough Council election
1996 Preston Borough Council election
1998 Preston Borough Council election
1999 Preston Borough Council election

2000s
2000 Preston Borough Council election
2002 Preston Borough Council election (New ward boundaries)
2003 Preston City Council election
2004 Preston City Council election
2006 Preston City Council election
2007 Preston City Council election (Some new ward boundaries)
2008 Preston City Council election

2010s
2010 Preston City Council election
2011 Preston City Council election
2012 Preston City Council election
2014 Preston City Council election
2015 Preston City Council election
2016 Preston City Council election
2018 Preston City Council election
2019 Preston City Council election (New ward boundaries)

2020s
2021 Preston City Council election
2022 Preston City Council election

District result maps

Changes between elections

1990 boundaries

2007 boundaries

Conservative councillor Damien Moore (Greyfriars) resigned from the council in March 2018 (he was elected Member of Parliament for Southport in 2017). The seat (term ending 2019 due to boundary changes trigger a full election) was filled in a double election for Greyfriars on 3 May.

References

By-election results

External links
Preston Council

 
Local government in Preston
Elections in the City of Preston
Council elections in Lancashire
Preston